Edmund Blum (9 September 1874 in Steinamanger/Szombathely Hungary – 14 April 1938 in Vienna) was an Austrian author and dentist.

Life 
Edmund Blum was born in 1874, the son of Alexander Blum and Julia Blum née Lazarus. He studied in Vienna, where 29. April 1898 he received a doctorate degree in medicine. He was also a writer and publisher.

Career 
Blum wrote over 25 books and also used the pseudonym E. B. Junkh. In 1920 he founded his own publishing house, called E.B. Seps, in Vienna. His first book was „Warum lassen sich die Juden nicht taufen?!“  published by 0. Th. Scholl. Later, in 1928, he founded a second publishing house, „Bergis Verlag Wien,“ which published other authors including Max Epstein, Hermann W. Anders, Hellmut Schlien, Fritz v. Unruh, and Berthold Sprung. Edmund Blum died 14. April 1938 in Vienna.

Trivia 
On 16 June fans of Irish writer James Joyce across the globe celebrate Bloomsday, and since 1994 in the Hungarian town Szombathely, the birthplace of Leopold Bloom's fictional father Rudolf Virag (Virag in German is Blume). A Joyce statue stands in front of the house at 40 Fö Square where Martin Blum, grandfather of Edmund Blum, lived in the second half of the 19th century.

Publications 
 Warum lassen sich die Juden nicht taufen?! (1913)
 Das Brauthemd (1919)
 Die Gefallene (1920)
 Die Halbjuden (1920)
 Junggesellennot, sexual-psychologischer Roman (1920)
 Die Lüsterne (1922)
 Die Gelegenheitsmacherin (1922)
 Magdas Fehltritt (1923)
 Die Hochzeitsnacht (1923)
 Die Verführte (1923)
 Judenhaß (1923)
 Ohne Wollust (1923)
 Sommerbräutigam
 Die Sumpfblume und andere Wiener Novellen (1923)
 Lebt Gott noch? Krise der Weltanschauung (1928)
 Die Damen Bolzani (1932)
 Des Selbstmörders Schwester (1932)
 Das Eheexperiment (1920)
 Sein Venusdienst (1923)
 Mädis Irrwege (1925)
 Die Verführte (1923)
 Der Hund und die Liebe (1923)
 Treu bis Neapel (1923)
 Die Schande (1923)
 Schach der Liebe (1923)

External links

verlagsgeschichte.murrayhall.com
bloomsday hungary
irishtimes.com

1874 births
1938 deaths
20th-century Austrian novelists
Jewish Austrian writers
Austrian male novelists
20th-century Austrian male writers
Austro-Hungarian writers